Private Robert Burns Brown (October 2, 1844 – July 30, 1916) was an American soldier who fought in the American Civil War. Brown received the country's highest award for bravery during combat, the Medal of Honor, for his action during the Battle of Missionary Ridge in Tennessee on November 25, 1863. He was honored with the award on 27 March 1890.

Biography
Brown was born in New Concord, Ohio on 2 October 1844. He enlisted into the 15th Ohio Infantry at Zanesville.

Medal of Honor citation

See also

List of American Civil War Medal of Honor recipients: A–F

References

1844 births
People of Ohio in the American Civil War
Union Navy sailors
United States Army Medal of Honor recipients
American Civil War recipients of the Medal of Honor
Grand Army of the Republic Commanders-in-Chief
People from New Concord, Ohio
1916 deaths